Usquepaug is a village in the towns of Richmond and South Kingstown in Washington County, Rhode Island, United States.  It is located along the Usquepaug River.  A portion of the village is listed on the National Register of Historic Places as the Usquepaug Road Historic District.

Overview
The village is the location of Kenyon Corn Meal Company, a gristmill founded in the late 17th century, and currently located in a building constructed in 1886.  The white corn meal is used in a traditional Rhode Island food, johnnycakes and the annual Johnny Cake Festival is held in Usquepaug.

References

Villages in Washington County, Rhode Island
Richmond, Rhode Island
South Kingstown, Rhode Island
Providence metropolitan area
Villages in Rhode Island